Levi is a masculine given name. It is the name of the priestly Levite tribe of ancient Judah. An etymology is given in the Bible in connection with the story of the birth of the tribes' founders. Levi may refer to:

Levi Addison Ault, Canadian/American businessman
Levi Bellfield (born 1968), British murderer
Levi Boone, American politician and mayor of Chicago
Levi Casboult, Australian rules footballer
Levi Celerio, Filipino composer and lyricist
Levi Coffin, American educator and a white abolitionist
Levi Eshkol, Israeli politician and Prime Minister of Israel
Levi Grant, American politician
Levi Johnson, American cornerback
Levi Johnston, American model and actor
Levi Leipheimer, American professional road bicycle racer
Levi Leiter, American businessman
Levi Lewis (disambiguation), multiple people
Levi Lincoln, Sr., American revolutionary and statesman
Levi Lincoln, Jr., American lawyer and politician
Levi Onwuzurike (born 1998), American football player
Levi Miller (born 2002), Australian Actor and Model
Levi P. Morton, American politician and Vice President of the United States
Levi Psavkin, Israeli Olympic runner
Levi Ponce, American painter
Levi Porter, English football player
 Levi Randolph (born 1992), basketball player for Hapoel Jerusalem of the Israeli Basketball Premier League
Levi Romero, Venezuelan baseball player
Levi Seacer Jr., American musician
Levi Strauss, German-Jewish-American inventor of blue jeans
Levi Stubbs, American singer
Levi Twiggs, American officer
Levi Wallace (born 1995), American football player
Levi Woodbury, American politician and Associate Justice of the Supreme Court of the United States
Levi Yitzchak of Berditchev, Rabbi and Hasidic leader
Levi Savage Jr. (1820-1910), American missionary to Asia for the Church of Jesus Christ of Latter-day Saints, Leader and pioneer in the Willie-Martin Handcart company.

Fictional characters
Levi Ackerman, a fictional character in the Attack on Titan manga.
Levi the Slasher, video game character.
 Levi Stewart, a fictional character in the novel Fangirl by Rainbow Rowell.
 Levi, a fictional character in E.L. James' novel Fifty Shades of Grey.
 Levi Weston, a fictional character in Power Rangers Ninja Steel.
Levi Fisher, main character of Siren in which he is seen as a brown-skinned merman warrior and is later given his name by some human friends
 Levi Boulder, a fictional character in the novel Anne of Green Gables by LM Montgomery.
Levi Schmitt, a fictional character in the ABC medical drama Grey's Anatomy

References

English masculine given names
Jewish given names
Masculine given names